Andris Džeriņš (born February 14, 1988 in Jēkabpils) is a Latvian professional ice hockey player, who currently plays for Steinbach Black Wings 1992 in the ICE Hockey League (ICEHL). He previously played two seasons of North American junior hockey with the Kingston Frontenacs of the Ontario Hockey League. He has also spent two seasons in the Czech Extraliga with Mountfield HK and 10 seasons in the Kontinental Hockey League (KHL) with Dinamo Riga.

Career statistics

Regular season and playoffs

International

References

External links
 
 

1988 births
Living people
People from Jēkabpils
EHC Black Wings Linz players
Dinamo Riga players
Kingston Frontenacs players
Latvian ice hockey centres
Stadion Hradec Králové players
HK Riga 2000 players
Ice hockey players at the 2022 Winter Olympics
Olympic ice hockey players of Latvia
Latvian expatriate sportspeople in Sweden
Latvian expatriate sportspeople in Finland
Latvian expatriate sportspeople in Austria
Latvian expatriate sportspeople in Canada
Latvian expatriate sportspeople in the Czech Republic
Latvian expatriate sportspeople in Denmark
Expatriate ice hockey players in Sweden
Expatriate ice hockey players in Finland
Expatriate ice hockey players in Austria
Expatriate ice hockey players in Canada
Expatriate ice hockey players in the Czech Republic
Expatriate ice hockey players in Denmark
Latvian expatriate ice hockey people